Christopher James Harris (born 20 January 1975) is a British automotive journalist, amateur racing driver and television presenter. Harris has worked as a reviewer, writer and editor for many automotive magazines, including Evo, Autocar and Jalopnik. He has presented numerous television and YouTube series through NBCSN and DRIVE.

Since 2017, Harris has been one of the three main presenters of Top Gear, after previously making regular appearances throughout the twenty-third series in 2016. He has his own YouTube Channel, Chris Harris on Cars, in which he and Neil Carey produce and film their own automotive reviews and content. On 28 June 2016, the Chris Harris on Cars web series was moved from YouTube to the official Top Gear website and in July 2016, Chris Harris on Cars was launched on BBC America.

Early life and education
Harris's father (Ian Harris) was an accountant, and his mother (Angela Wilding) a Cypriot autocross racer. He was educated at Clifton College, Bristol.

Journalism

Harris began his career in the automotive industry working for Autocar , performing various menial tasks, or, as he himself describes it, "cleaning ashtrays". Eventually, he was promoted to an official road-test editor position within Autocar and gained recognition and credibility as a journalist by writing many automotive reviews, as well as a regular opinion column.  At Autocar Harris earned the nickname of "Monkey", a reference to an unseen character "Monkey" Harris in Only Fools and Horses. In 2008, Harris left Autocar magazine to co-found a new web-based digital platform called Drivers Republic. A year later, the enterprise ceased operations. In a statement, Drivers Republic explained the abrupt termination was due to "differences in our vision about future priorities". Immediately after the shutdown, Harris joined Evo as a writer and reviewer, publishing his first article there on 12 October 2009. His features for Evo were published every few months until 21 December 2011, and he resumed writing for Evo regularly on 10 April 2015.

Subsequently, Harris created an opinion and review YouTube series in partnership with /DRIVE. This new series aired weekly (starting in early 2012) on /DRIVE's YouTube channel,  called /CHRIS HARRIS ON CARS. Each episode featured a different car, either owned by Harris, or loaned to /DRIVE temporarily by the manufacturer. The series greatly expanded /DRIVE's viewership, with 104 videos together amassing over 3,500,000 views in two years. After two years of hosting automotive videos, Harris left the network in 2014 to create his own YouTube channel. He maintained a positive relationship with /DRIVE, remaining "a close friend of the /DRIVE brand".

On 27 October 2014, Harris' YouTube channel, Chris Harris on Cars, was created. Harris partnered with longtime colleague and cameraman and editor Neil Carey and still shoots all Chris Harris on Cars (commonly abbreviated "CHOC") independently. Chris Harris on Cars has over 440,000 YouTube subscribers and nearly 45,000,000 views. In addition, on 6 November 2014, Harris began writing for Jalopnik, an online automotive blog administrated by Kinja. Harris also has since partnered with /DRIVE through NBCSN and now appears on that channel, reviewing cars and taking part in automotive-related activities with other hosts, on a regular basis.

Television 
In February 2016, Harris officially joined the new cast of Top Gear. Harris served as a recurring presenter for the television show in 2016, but was promoted to a main presenter following the resignation of Chris Evans. From the twenty-fourth series, he presented the series alongside co-hosts Matt LeBlanc and Rory Reid. As of the twenty-seventh series, he hosts the show alongside Freddie Flintoff and Paddy McGuinness.

In 2016, Harris's web series, Chris Harris On Cars, was absorbed by the BBC.

Motor racing 

Harris has had an extensive racing career.  He won his first race in a Formula Palmer Audi in 2000. Some of the racing cars he has driven include a Porsche 911 Cup, Renault Sport R.S. 01, Aston Martin Vantage GT12, Van Diemen FF1600, Rover SD1 and a Jaguar E-Type. He has also raced in endurance races like the 24 Hours Nürburgring in 2010 and 2015. He was on the Glickenhaus team for 2016, but their car was crashed during a practice session. Harris often makes videos about the races he is attempting: sometimes teaching basic race techniques and other times simply sharing his experiences.

Britcar 24 Hour results

24 Hours Nürburgring results 

Harris often discuss technical racing terms in his non-racing focused videos. Harris also emphasises the importance of driving and racing safety in many of his videos, especially when teaching techniques like drifting.

Blancpain GT Series Endurance Amateur Cup results

Acquisitions and funding

Acquisitions 

While Harris has owned several exotic cars, such as a Ferrari FF, most of the cars Harris reviews are loaned to him by manufacturers. Manufacturers often give automotive journalists press cars, in the hope that a reviewer will give the new car a positive review that boost the car's sales. Harris receives many press cars, sometimes for extended periods of time. Harris has even received cars for up to six months, such as an Audi RS 6. Harris is often characterised as passionate and comical in his reviews of press cars, saying in one review of the Audi RS 6: "life is incomplete without you".

Funding 

In Harris's early career, magazines such as Autocar and Evo paid him for his writing as a journalist. As his career progressed, Harris began to branch out on his own. Throughout the production of /CHRIS HARRIS ON CARS on the /DRIVE YouTube channel, he depended partially on sponsorship from various brands and through YouTube advertising revenue. Eventually, the /DRIVE channel switched partially to /DRIVE+, a paid subscription channel. In his current production series, Chris Harris on Cars, Harris supports both himself and cameraman/editor Neil Carey. Occasionally, Harris posts videos featuring sponsored content, from brands like Pirelli. He also receives compensation from NBCSN for his regular television series, /DRIVE.

Controversies

Ferrari 
Harris was banned from reviewing Ferrari cars on 2 February 2011, after writing an article titled, "How Ferrari Spins". In his article, he criticised the firm for trying "to win every test (review) at any cost" and called it a "profoundly irritating" brand. He also gave his opinion that an automotive journalist is forced to please Ferrari with a positive review in order to maintain a relationship with the brand. Though he was banned from reviewing Ferrari cars supplied by the company, Harris was still able to review several Ferraris unofficially by borrowing cars bought by friends such as Pink Floyd drummer Nick Mason. 

In late 2013, Harris and Ferrari reconciled, and he has since officially reviewed many Ferraris.

Lamborghini 
In 2014, Harris was banned from reviewing Lamborghini cars, because of an article he wrote entitled "Lamborghinis Are The Perfect Cars For People Who Can't Drive", in which he criticised many characteristics of the Lamborghini brand, saying their "future is bleak". Harris stated that the brand "can't support its looks with adequate (driving) dynamics". He also noted several Lamborghini malfunctions: in one case, as he was driving, "the brakes (on the Lamborghini) caught fire". Consequently, Lamborghini ended the relationship with Harris. Harris has recently (as of December 2017) started reviewing Lamborghinis again by driving the Lamborghini Huracán under his Chris Harris Drives brand hosted by Top Gear.

Filmography

References

External links
 
 /DRIVE, YouTube channel.
 Chris Harris on Cars, YouTube channel.
 Chris Harris' First Article, Evo, October 2009.

Motoring journalists
British journalists
British motoring journalists
Living people
1975 births
British television presenters
Top Gear people
People from Beaconsfield
People educated at Clifton College
ASCAR drivers
Britcar 24-hour drivers
Nürburgring 24 Hours drivers
Porsche Carrera Cup Germany drivers